Gangwon or Kangwŏn may refer to:

 Gangwon Province (historical), the Goryeo, Joseon Dynasty and the Japanese Korean province
 Gangwon Province (South Korea), a province of South Korea, with its capital at Chuncheon. Before the division of Korea in 1945, Gangwon and its North Korean neighbour Kangwŏn formed a single province
 Kangwon Province (North Korea), a province of North Korea, with its capital at Wŏnsan. Before the division of Korea in 1945, Kangwŏn Province and its South Korean neighbour Gangwon Province (also spelled Kangwon Province) formed a single province that excluded Wŏnsan
 Gangwon FC, a South Korean football club. Based in Gangwon Province of South Korea, Gangwon FC joined the K League as its 15th club for the 2009 season